The Salvos of the Aurora Cruiser is a 1965 Soviet drama film directed by Yuri Vyshinsky.

Plot 
The film takes place in Petrograd in October 1917. Lenin is going to organize an armed uprising, while Zinoviev is against it. Most members of the Central Committee support Lenin. The Russian Provisional Government sends its troops to the Winter Palace, and the commander of Aurora Erickson receives an order to go to sea...

Cast 
 Sergey Boyarskiy
 Zinaida Kirienko
 Mikhail Kuznetsov
 Pavel Luspekayev
 Mikhail Yekaterininsky

References

External links 
 

1965 films
1960s Russian-language films
Soviet drama films
1965 drama films